West Mercia Police, formerly the West Mercia Constabulary, is the territorial police force responsible for policing the counties of Herefordshire, Shropshire (including Telford and Wrekin) and Worcestershire in England. The force area covers  making it the fourth largest police area in England and Wales. The resident population of the area is 1.19 million Its name comes from the ancient kingdom of Mercia.

The force represents a diverse range of policing environments from densely populated urban areas on the edge of Birmingham as well as Telford, Shrewsbury, and Worcester, to sparsely populated rural areas, such as Herefordshire, which remains an important part of the force's responsibility.

As of September 2017, the force has a workforce of 2,017 police officers, 223 police community support officers, 1541 police staff and 388 members of the special constabulary.

The force has its headquarters in the historical manor house and grounds of Hindlip Hall on the outskirts of Worcester. Its badge combines the heraldry of Worcestershire, Herefordshire and Shropshire.

History

The force was formed on 1 October 1967, by the merger of the Worcestershire Constabulary, Herefordshire Constabulary, Shropshire Constabulary and Worcester City Police. It lost territory to West Midlands Police when that was constituted on 1 April 1974. It changed its name from "West Mercia Constabulary" to "West Mercia Police" on 5 May 2009.

Merger plans
In November 2005, the government announced major reforms of policing in England and Wales, including the possibility of mergers. Under final proposals made by the Home Secretary on 6 February 2006, it would merge with Staffordshire Police, Warwickshire Constabulary and West Midlands Police to form a single strategic force for the West Midlands region. The proposals were unpopular with many of the local authorities in the West Mercia area, but was criticised especially strongly by West Mercia Constabulary itself, especially as at the time it was rated the best force in the country. When John Reid became Home Secretary in 2006, he put all merger plans on hold. Subsequent governments have not made any indication of re-introducing such plans.

Chief constables
 1967–1975 : Sir John Willison
 1975–1981 : Alex Rennie
 1981–1985 : Bob Cozens
 1985–1991 : Anthony Mullett
 1991–1999 : David Cecil Blakey
 1999–2003 : Peter Hampson
 2003–2011 : Paul West
 2011–2016 : David Shaw
 2016–2021  : Anthony Bangham
2021–present : Pippa Mills

Organisation

West Mercia Police is overseen by an elected West Mercia Police and Crime Commissioner, which replaced the West Mercia Police Authority in 2012.

The force is organised into five Local Policing Units (LPAs), which are alphabetically coded (C, D, E, F, G) by geographical areas. Operating across three counties, West Mercia Police maintains many stations, with each LPA having an HQ Police station. The LPAs are further divided into 82 Safer Neighbourhood Teams (SNT).

PEEL inspection
Her Majesty's Inspectorate of Constabulary and Fire & Rescue Services (HMICFRS) conducts a periodic police effectiveness, efficiency and legitimacy (PEEL) inspection of each police service's performance. In its latest PEEL inspection, West Mercia Police was rated as follows:

Volunteer police cadets scheme
A volunteer cadet scheme had existed in the Telford division since the early 1990s and in September 2013, the scheme was expanded force-wide, creating a new detachment of police cadets in each Territorial Policing Unit area. Each detachment is headquartered in the respective TPU HQ, except the South Worcestershire detachment, which is based at Tudor Grange Academy.

In 2010, the Telford Cadets Detachment was awarded The Queen's Award for Voluntary Service.

According to West Mercia Police's website, "The scheme is aimed at young people who wish to engage in a program that offers them an opportunity to gain a practical understanding of policing, develop their spirit of adventure and good citizenship, while supporting their local policing priorities through volunteering, working with partner agencies and positive participation in their communities."

A new intake of approximately 15 new cadets per detachment occurs annually. New recruits must be aged 16 or over and have finished secondary education. Young people can remain as cadets for up to two years. Cadets can then consider joining the force at age 18, becoming a cadet leader in their detachment, or leaving the scheme altogether.

Each detachment is led by several cadet leaders who are police officers, PCSOs and police volunteers from the force.

Alliances
West Mercia was a partner, alongside three other forces, in the Central Motorway Police Group (CMPG). On 8 April 2018, West Mercia withdrew from the CMPG, with the 25 West Mercia police officers attached to the group returning to the in-force roads policing service.

In 2013, West Mercia Police and Warwickshire Police formed an alliance, sharing certain administrative functions in order to save both forces money. In October 2018, West Mercia announced its intention to withdraw from the alliance.

Controversies
A 2022 inquiry into the Telford child sexual exploitation scandal – in which all those who were convicted were British Pakistanis – found that "in some cases the decisions of West Mercia Police officers about whether or not to investigate a particular piece of intelligence or complaint were influenced by assumptions about race. Whether because of ideas of difficulties investigating what was seen as a closed and hostile community, because of fear of complaint, or because of concern about the impact an investigation might have had on racial tensions, I cannot determine".

See also
List of law enforcement agencies in the United Kingdom, Crown Dependencies and British Overseas Territories
Law enforcement in the United Kingdom
Road Policing Unit
Police cadets in the United Kingdom

Bibliography
 Policing Shropshire 1836–1967 by Douglas J. Elliott. Contains black and white plates, including illustration of badges as a frontispiece.

References

External links 

 
 West Mercia Police at HMICFRS

Government agencies established in 1967
Organisations based in Worcestershire
Police forces of England
1967 establishments in England